Jerry Tillery (born October 8, 1996) is an American football defensive tackle for the Las Vegas Raiders of the National Football League (NFL). He played college football at Notre Dame.

Early years
Tillery attended Evangel Christian Academy in Shreveport, Louisiana. As a senior he had 93 tackles and seven sacks. He committed to the University of Notre Dame to play college football.

College career

Tillery was originally going to play offensive tackle as a freshman at Notre Dame in 2015, but it was later decided he would play defensive tackle. That season, he played in 12 games with three starts and recorded 12 tackles and a sack. As a sophomore in 2016, he started 11 of 12 games, recording 37 tackles. As a junior in 2017, Tillery started all 13 games, finishing the season with 56 tackles and 4.5 sacks. He returned to Notre Dame for his senior year in 2018.

College statistics

Professional career

Los Angeles Chargers
Tillery was drafted by the Los Angeles Chargers 28th overall in the first round of the 2019 NFL Draft.

In Week 9 of the 2020 season against the Las Vegas Raiders, Tillery recorded a strip sack on Derek Carr that he also recovered during the 27–25 loss.  This was Tillery’s first forced fumble and fumble recovery in the NFL.

The Chargers declined the fifth-year option on Tillery's contract on May 2, 2022, making him a free agent after the season. Tillery was waived on November 10, 2022.

Las Vegas Raiders
On November 14, 2022, Tillery was claimed off waivers by the Las Vegas Raiders.

Tilley re-signed with the Raiders on March 17, 2023.

References

External links
 Sports Reference (college)
Notre Dame Fighting Irish bio

1996 births
Living people
Players of American football from Shreveport, Louisiana
American football defensive tackles
Notre Dame Fighting Irish football players
Los Angeles Chargers players
Las Vegas Raiders players